Alahad TV (   Alahad) is a satellite and terrestrial public broadcaster and television network in Iraq that was set up after 2009.  It is an Arabic language

See also

Television in Iraq

References

External links
 

Asa'ib Ahl al-Haq
Television stations in Iraq
Arab mass media
Arabic-language television stations
Television channels and stations established in 2010